Brent Dione Williams (born  October 23, 1964) is a former American football defensive end who played for three teams in an 11-year National Football League (NFL) career. His son is former NFL offensive tackle and current WWE professional wrestler Brennan Williams.

Career
Williams attended the University of Toledo from 1982 to 1985, where he played college football for the Toledo Rockets. In his last two seasons he was elected to the First-team All-MAC. In 2016 he was inducted into the Varsity 'T' Hall of Fame, the hall of fame of the Toledo Rockets, for his achievements.

In the 1986 NFL Draft, Williams was selected in the seventh round by the New England Patriots. In his first six seasons, he started every game for five seasons. The only exception was the 1987 season, which was plagued by a players' strike. He played a total of eight seasons with the Patriots. During this time he achieved 43.5 sacks, which in 1993 was the second most and currently the sixth most in the history of the franchise after Andre Tippett's 100. He was elected to the 1990s All-Decade Team for his achievements with the Patriots. In 1994 he joined the Seattle Seahawks, but became a free agent after the 1995 season. In 1996 he played his final season for the New York Jets.

References

1964 births
Living people
American football defensive ends
New England Patriots players
New York Jets players
Players of American football from Flint, Michigan
Seattle Seahawks players
Toledo Rockets football players